Jonathan Hole (August 13, 1904 – February 11, 1998) was an American actor whose entertainment career covered five genres over 50 years. From his early days on the vaudeville stage and in legitimate theater, through radio, television and feature-length films that took his career up to the 1990s, Hole created a variety of characters in hundreds of roles.

Early years 
Hole was born in Eldora, Iowa, the son of Mr. and Mrs. H. E. Hole. He graduated from North High School in Des Moines and attended Drake University.

Career 
Hole's career began in vaudeville in the 1920s. He further honed his acting skills during 1924–1934 in stage productions in New York. In 1926, he joined the Morgan Wallace players as stage manager at the Princess Theater in Des Moines, Iowa. By the end of 1929, he had also performed with stock theater companies in Brooklyn, New York; Dayton, Ohio; Lynn, Massachusetts; and Portland, Maine. In 1930, one of the productions he appeared in was the comedy Cinderelative that had been written by Dorothy Heyward.

Hole was also a radio performer active in his native Iowa as well as New York City, Detroit, Chicago, and Los Angeles, California. While working as an announcer on WBBM in Chicago, his last name was temporarily changed to Cole by the station. In 1942 in Chicago, Hole was a co-chair of the Red Cross entertainment committee on war relief. He portrayed Paul Henderson on the radio soap opera Ma Perkins.

In 1951, he began acting in movies with a part in the Marie Windsor, Steve Brodie vehicle Two-Dollar Bettor. Although his appearances were usually uncredited, he appeared in thirty-six feature-length films.  Among those were A Man Called Peter in 1955, Beloved Infidel in 1959,  4 for Texas in 1963 and The Graduate in 1967.

Hole carved out a long career in television, beginning in 1951 with an appearance on Hollywood Theatre Time,  in the episode Mr. Young's Sprouts, which starred Gale Storm and Don DeFore. He often made repeat appearances on television shows, appearing in multiple episodes playing different roles.  He appeared seven times each in Dragnet,   Burke's Law,  and Green Acres.  He appeared in five Maverick  episodes, and five times on CBS's Perry Mason. Hole appeared twice on ABC's The Life and Legend of Wyatt Earp, with Hugh O'Brian. He appeared in episodes 5 and 48 of Batman. Twice he played the part of Elmer Clark on Walter Brennan's The Real McCoys. Hole also guest starred on The Andy Griffith Show as Orville Monroe, the undertaker. He made 200 appearances in 121 television shows and made-for-television movies.  Although he played a variety of parts, he was perhaps most frequently seen in comic roles, often as a fussy and somewhat self-important clerk, manager, or minor bureaucrat.  His final television appearance was in Silhouette, a 1990 murder mystery starring Faye Dunaway.

During his early years in Hollywood his day job was at the California Employment Development Department.

Personal life and death 
Hole married actress Betty Hanna, whom he met when they acted together in Dayton, Ohio. She preceded him in death. He died in North Hollywood in 1998 at age 93, and is buried with his wife at Westwood Memorial Park in Los Angeles.

Stage work 
Partial listing, New York stage productions only

{| class="wikitable sortable"
|+Theatre
|-
! scope="col"  class="unsortable" | Opening date
! scope="col"  class="unsortable" | Closing date
!scope="col"  | Title
!scope="col"   class="unsortable" | Role
! scope="col"  class="unsortable" | Setting
!scope="col"   class="unsortable" | Genre
! scope="col"  class="unsortable" | Playwright
! scope="col"  class="unsortable" | Theatre
|-
| scope="row"  |August 13, 1924 || Aug 1924 || Dr. David's Dad  || Eric || The Bronx || Comedy || Armin Friedmann, Louis NerzBook adapted by Carrington North and Joseph J. Garren || Vanderbilt Theatre
|-
| scope="row"  |January 26, 1928 || Feb 1928 || 57 Bowery || Terry || New York City || Comedy || Edward Locke || Wallack's Theatre
|-
| scope="row"  |September 18, 1930 ||  Sept 1930 || Cinderelative  || Horace J. Hill || Paris, New York|| Comedy || Dorothy Heyward, Dorothy De Jagers || Comedy (Artef) Theatre
|-
| scope="row"  |Nov 9, 1931|| Nov 1931||  Peter Flies High   || Peter Turner || Rosedale, New Jersey  || Comedy ||  Myron Coureval Fagan || Gaiety Theatre
|-
| scope="row"  |August 1, 1932 || August 8, 1932 || Chamberlain Brown's Scrap Book'  || Station Announcer, Francis Cameron||  a vaudeville theatre || Vaudeville music revue ||  || Ambassador Theatre
|-
|scope="row"  |December 26, 1932 || Jan 1933 || The Little Black Book ||H. D. Porter ||  Washington, D.C. ||Comedy, drama || Harold Sherman || Selwyn Theatre
|-
|scope="row"  |December 25, 1933 || Jan 1934 || The Locked Room  || John Burgess, Jr.|| New York City || Melodrama ||  Herbert Ashton Jr. || Ambassador Theatre
|-
| scope="row"  |October 15, 1934 || Dec1934 ||Lost Horizons  || David Prescott || Canada, United States || Fantasy ||    Harry Segall, script revision by John Hayden  || St. James Theatre
|-

|}

 Television 

 1951 Hollywood Theatre Time1952–1955  Dragnet   (7 episodes).... Clifton Allen / Charles Elliott / Paul West / Martin Tanner/ Wilbur Trench
 1954 Mayor of the Town....Rogers
 1954 Fireside Theater....Mike
 1954  Lux Video Theatre....Hotel Clerk
1955 Climax!1955 Ford Theatre....Dr. Stanley
1956 Highway Patrol....Roger Taylor
1956 TV Reader's Digest....Cartwright
1954–1956 Four Star Playhouse  (2 episodes)....Harold / Hotel Clerk
1956 Crossroads1956 The Adventures of Hiram Holliday....Master of Ceremonies
1956 Studio 57  (2 episodes)....Clerk
1957 How to Marry a Millionaire....Clerk
1957 Have Gun – Will Travel....Elkins
1957 The Adventures of Jim Bowie....Dr. Fry
1957 Wanted Dead or Alive The Spur episode .... Bartender
1958 The Gray Ghost....Barker
1957–1958 Hey, Jeannie!  (3 episodes)....Durkee / Mr. Carter / Frazer
1958 Cheyenne....Gerald Banks
1958 Zorro   (3 episodes)....Alfredo
1958 The Lineup1958 Leave It to Beaver....Bank Teller
1958 Perry Mason....Arthur Williams
1958 Maverick ("Shady Deal at Sunny Acres")....Desk Clerk / Fred Wiggins
1958 Yancy Derringer....Emmet Proctor
1958 Trackdown....Coroner Petrie
1958 The Thin Man....Mr. Lansing – Pigeon Club Director / Committeeman
1959 Dick Powell's Zane Grey Theatre....Ned Watley
1959 Wanted: Dead or Alive....Roy the Bartender
1959 The Ann Sothern Show....Manager
1957–1959 State Trooper    (2 episodes)....Harry Stack / Art Dealer
1959 Peter Gunn.....Leeds
1959 Cimarron City....Mortimer Kleckley
1959 Bat Masterson....Mart – Barfly
1958–1959 Mike Hammer  (2 episodes)....Herman K. Berman / Man in Hotel Room
1957–1959 The Gale Storm Show  (2 episodes)....Mr. Pool
1958–1959 Trackdown   (2 episodes)....Mike Kilroy / Coroner Petrie
1959 Tales of Wells Fargo....Burns
1959 The David Niven Show....Gus
1959 Markham....the Chef
1959 M Squad....Arthur Leslie
1959 Not for Hire....Willoughby
1957–1959 The Life and Legend of Wyatt Earp  (2 episodes)....Mr. Carp / Nathaniel Cooker / Heber Morse
1959 Fury....Ben Carr
1959 Bronco....Carver
1957–1960 Richard Diamond, Private Detective   (3 episodes)....Bank Manager / Virgil Twinkham / Colin
1960 The Dennis O'Keefe Show....George Roebuck
1960 Alcoa Presents: One Step Beyond....Mr. Johnson- Landlord
1958–1960 Maverick   (5 episodes)....Fred / Marvin Dilbey / San Francisco Jeweler / Brent Williams / Desk Clerk
1960 The Deputy....Mr. Curzon
1960 Twilight Zone....Team Doctor
1960 Bourbon Street Beat....Mr. Maywearing (uncredited)/ Psychiatrist
1960 Angel....Mr. Davis
1960–1961 The Andy Griffith Show....Orville Monroe
1960–1961 Lock-Up   (2 episodes)....Horace Sobel / Clerk at Galieote's
1961 Pete and Gladys....Inspector Perkins
1961 The Many Loves of Dobie Gillis....Mr. Mimms
1961 The New Bob Cummings Show1961 The Detectives Starring Robert Taylor....Head Waiter
1961 Alcoa Premiere....Elliott
1960–1961 Bachelor Father   (2 episodes)....Mr. Cribbens / Mr. Sinclair
1962 My Three Sons....Mr. Tully
1961–1962 87th Precinct   (2 episodes)....Mr. Benton
1962 The Jack Benny Program   (2 episodes)
1962 The Real McCoys ....Elmer Clark
1962 GE True....Fenwick
1960–1963 Dennis the Menace  (3 episodes)....Addison Brock / Mr. Trumble / Mr. Bradshaw
1962–1963 The Wide Country   (2 episodes)....Clerk / Henry Meyers
1962–1963 The Real McCoys....Elmer Clark
1963 Temple Houston....T.T. Teague
1960–1964 Rawhide   (4 episodes)....Drummer / Otis Eames / Lawyer / Josiah Grimby
1958–1964 Perry Mason   (5 episodes)....Whitey / Edward Link / Stanley Roderick / Everett Wormser / Arthur Williams
1964 The Addams Family....Professor Simms
1964 My Living Doll....Mr. Whitson
1964 Bob Hope Presents the Chrysler Theatre....Fred Walters
1961–1964 Bonanza   (2 episodes)....Dr. Kleiser / Hershell
1964 The Outer Limits....The Pedestrian
1961–1965 Hazel   (3 episodes)....Mr. Wilson / Fulton / Personnel Manager
1965 The Rogues   (2 episodes)....Hotel Clerk / Teller
1965 The Alfred Hitchcock Hour....The Hotel Clerk
1965 The Donna Reed Show....Mr. Martindale
1963–1965 Burke's Law   (7 episodes)....Digby / Mr. Alexander / George / Mr. Swift the Auctioneer / Art Lecturer / Henry Newbold / Airlines Official
1965 Ben Casey....Dr. Pinchney
1965 Petticoat JunctionS2;Ep34....Mr. Earnshaw
1965 The Patty Duke Show....Jack Ralston
1964–1966 My Favorite Martian   (2 episodes)....Walter Poppe / William Stone
1966 Laredo....Millford Jenkins
1965–1966 Honey West   (2 episodes)....Mr. Gruder / Chemist Grady
1964–1966 The Farmer's Daughter  (3 episodes)....Albert / Mr. Stanley / Mr. Gridley
1966 Summer Fun....Nichols
1966  Occasional Wife....Druggist
1966 The Man from U.N.C.L.E.....Dr. Zohmer
1966 Batman   (episodes 5 and 48)....Jewelry Store Owner / Museum Attendant
1966 Please Don't Eat the Daisies....Clerk / Court Clerk
1966–1967 The Lucy Show   (3 episodes)....Jonathon Winslow / Mr. Haskell / Collins
1966–1967 I Dream of Jeannie (2 episodes)....Clerk / Van Weesen
1967 Rango (Episode: "Shootout at Mesa Flats")....Sweeper
1967 The Wild Wild West....The Bank Manager
1963–1968 The Virginian   (4 episodes)....Hotel Clerk / Stage Depot Clerk / Coroner
1967–1968 The Guns of Will Sonnett   (3 episodes)....Clevenger / Rob Quail / Clerk
1967–1969 The Flying Nun   (2 episodes)....Process Server – Acting as Tourist / 2nd Ornithologist
1969  The Name of the Game....Victor Masters
1967–1969  The Big Valley   (2 episodes)....Clerk / Beckett
1969 The Mod Squad....Mr. Levero – Caretaker
1969  The Debbie Reynolds Show....Gourmet Proprietor
1964–1969 Petticoat Junction   (4 episodes)....Hank Thackery / Mr. Earnshaw / Mr. Bunce
1966–1970 Bewitched   (3 episodes)....Mr. Waterman / Manager / Principal
1970 Barefoot in the Park1970 The Over-the-Hill Gang Rides Again....Parson
1970 Hallmark Hall of Fame1966–1970 Green Acres   (7 episodes)....Clerk / Claxton / Mr. Fortney / Announcer (voice) / Mr. Powers
1971 Adam-12....Paul Weber
1970–1971 The Brady Bunch   (2 episodes)....Wally Witherspoon / Thackery
1972 Call Her Mom....Trustee #3
1968–1973 Here's Lucy   (2 episodes)....Mr. Dinwitty / Floorwalker
1972 The Smith Family  Winner Take All....Mr. Minnick
1973 McCloud....Mr. Darwin
1972–1973 Love, American Style   (2 episodes)....Junk Shop Proprietor (segment "Love and the Three-Timer") / Omar (segment "Love and the Super Lover")
1974 Cannon1974 Kung Fu....Hobbs
1975 Ellery Queen....Dress Shop Manager
1982 Father Murphy....Hotel Manager
1985 Hotel....Charlie
1989 Moonlighting....Chip
1987–1989 Highway to Heaven   (2 episodes)....Desk Clerk / Clerk
1990 Silhouette...Man in Hotel (final film role)

 Films 

1951: Two-Dollar Bettor .... Race Track Drunk Bettor (uncredited)
1952: My Pal Gus .... Judge (uncredited)
1953: The Glory Brigade .... Col. Peterson (uncredited)
1953: The Kid from Left Field .... Truant Officer (uncredited)
1953:  A Blueprint for Murder .... Dr. Stevenson (uncredited)
1954: Riot in Cell Block 11 .... Reporter Russell
1954: Woman's World .... Executive Reception Guest (uncredited)
1954: The Bob Mathias Story .... Olympics Reporter (uncredited)
1954 Men of the Fighting Lady announcer
1955: A Man Called Peter .... Church Elder (scenes deleted)
1955: Headline Hunters .... Fred Finley – Drunk (uncredited)
1955: Illegal .... Doctor (uncredited)
1956: Ransom! .... Dan – Telephone Technician (uncredited)
1956: The Opposite Sex .... Phelps Potter
1956: Three Brave Men .... Pharmacist Gibbons (uncredited)
1957: Slander .... Cereal Company Executive (uncredited)
1957: Top Secret Affair .... Mr. Jones, Process Server (uncredited)
1957: The Way to the Gold .... Mr. Felton
1957: Kiss Them for Me .... Nightclub Manager (uncredited)
1958: Cry Terror! .... Airline Executive
1958: The Decks Ran Red .... Mr. Adams
1959: Cast a Long Shadow ....  Charlie Boles (uncredited)
1959: The Man Who Understood Women .... Interviewer at Premiere (uncredited)
1959: -30- .... Pettifog
1959: The Four Skulls of Jonathan Drake .... Funeral Director (uncredited)
1959: Beloved Infidel .... Dr. Hoffman (uncredited)
1962: Moon Pilot .... Hotel Clerk (uncredited)
1963: 4 for Texas .... Renée, headwaiter on Riverboat
1964: Looking for Love .... Store Owner (uncredited)
1964: I'd Rather Be Rich .... Clergyman (uncredited)
1967: Eight on the Lam .... Jewelry Salesman (uncredited)
1967: The Graduate .... Mr. Singleman (uncredited)
1968: The Impossible Years .... Homeowner (uncredited)
1968: The Split .... Ticket Seller (uncredited)
1969: Some Kind of a Nut .... Second Vice President 
1969: The Computer Wore Tennis Shoes .... Scientist (uncredited)
1971: The Million Dollar Duck .... Refinery Agent (uncredited)
1978: Till Death'' .... Mr. Hutton

References

External links 
 
 

1904 births
1998 deaths
20th-century American male actors
American male stage actors
American male film actors
American male radio actors
American male television actors
Male actors from Iowa
People from Eldora, Iowa
Burials at Westwood Village Memorial Park Cemetery
Vaudeville performers